U.S. Highway 87 (US 87) is a north–south United States highway (though it is signed east–west in New Mexico) that runs for 1,998 miles (3,215 km) from northern Montana to southern Texas, making it the longest north-south road to not have a "1" in its number and the third longest north-south road in the country, behind U.S. 41 and U.S. 1. Most of the portion from Billings, Montana to Raton, New Mexico is co-signed along Interstates 90 and 25.  It is also co-signed along the majority of Interstate 27 in Texas. As of 2004, the highway's northern terminus is in Havre, Montana, at U.S. Highway 2. Its southern terminus is in Port Lavaca, Texas.

Route description

Texas

In Texas, US 87 is a north–south highway that begins near the Gulf Coast in Port Lavaca, Texas and heads north through San Antonio, Lubbock, Amarillo, and Dalhart to the New Mexico border near Texline.

New Mexico
US 87 continues in a northwesterly direction in New Mexico, and is signed by NMDOT primarily as an east–west route. It merges with US 64 (and thus the Santa Fe Trail National Scenic Byway) in Clayton, shortly after entering New Mexico. It continues to the northwest until Des Moines, when it takes a more westerly approach to Raton. In Raton, it separates from US 64 and merges with Interstate 25 and US-85, with which it remains concurrent through Raton Pass and into Colorado, though it is unsigned on much of the concurrency.

Colorado

US 87 remains concurrent with Interstate 25 throughout the state of Colorado, which is a rare occurrence for a US highway to have a concurrency with an Interstate in its entirety within state boundaries.

Wyoming
US 87 remains concurrent with Interstate 25 northward until exit 160 east of Glenrock where it joins US Route 20/US Route 26 from Glenrock to Casper. In Casper it splits from US-20/26 and rejoins I-25 at exit 186. It then remains concurrent with Interstate 25 northward until its terminus with Interstate 90. It then follows I-90 west to exit 44 where it runs up to Sheridan. A portion of US-87 has been washed out for several years along this stretch and "temporary" detour signs are posted directing US-87 traffic along Wyoming Highway 193 through Story. In Sheridan US-87 rejoins Interstate 90 into Montana.

Montana

US 87 remains concurrent with Interstate 90 westward until Billings, where it breaks off and heads north.  Between Crow Agency and Billings, US 87 and I-90 are merged with US 212. It intersects with (and briefly merges with) US 12 in Roundup and continues north with a slight bend to the northwest until, at Grass Range it takes a sharp turn to the west at an intersection with Montana State Highway 200.  US 87 remains concurrent with Montana State Highway 200 until Great Falls.  In Lewistown, it merges with US 191 and remains heading generally west. Some ten miles (16 km) out of Lewistown, it breaks with US 191 and merges with Montana State Highway 3, heading generally northwest and merging briefly with US 89 before breaking with all three in Great Falls. US 87 heads northeast then east to Fort Benton and then generally northeast to its terminus with US 2 about two miles (3 km) west of Havre.

History

US 87 originally ran northwest out of Great Falls, Montana towards the eastern border of Glacier National Park. US 87 ran to the Canadian Border at the Piegan Border Crossing. This was changed in 1934, when US Route 89 was diverted to US 87's routing to Glacier Park. US 87 ended in Great Falls until circa 1945 when it was extended to its current northern terminus in Havre, Montana.

U.S. Route 185 was formed in 1926, and extended from US 85 in Cheyenne north to Orin. It became part of a southern extension and realignment of US 87 in 1936.

Major intersections
Texas
  in Port Lavaca
  in Victoria
  in Victoria
  in Cuero. The highways travel concurrently to southwest of Cuero.
  in San Antonio
  in San Antonio. I-10/US 87 travels concurrently to Comfort. US 87/US 90 travels concurrently through San Antonio.
  in San Antonio
  in San Antonio. I-35/US 87 travels concurrently through San Antonio.
  on the Balcones Heights–San Antonio city line
  in Fredericksburg. The highways travel concurrently through Fredericksburg.
  northwest of Mason. The highways travel concurrently to Brady.
  in Brady. The highways travel concurrently to Brady.
  northwest of Brady
  in Eden
  in San Angelo. The highways travel concurrently through San Angelo.
  in San Angelo
  in Big Spring
  south of Los Ybanez. The highways travel concurrently to Lamesa.
  in Tahoka
  in Lubbock. The highways travel concurrently to south of Kress.
  in Lubbock
  in Lubbock
  in Lubbock
  in Plainview
  north-northwest of Tulia. The highways travel concurrently to south-southeast of Happy.
  in Canyon. The highways travel concurrently to Amarillo.
  north of Canyon. The highways travel concurrently to Amarillo.
  in Amarillo. US 87/US 287 travels concurrently through Amarillo.
  in Amarillo
  in Amarillo. The highways travel concurrently to Dumas.
  in Hartley. The highways travel concurrently to Dalhart.
  in Dalhart
New Mexico
  in Clayton. US 64/US 87 travels concurrently to Raton.
  in Raton. I-25/US 87 travels concurrently to southeast of Glenrock, Wyoming. US 85/US 87 travels concurrently to Fountain, Colorado.
Colorado
  in Trinidad. The highways travel concurrently to Walsenburg.
  in Pueblo. The highways travel concurrently through Pueblo.
  in Fountain.
  in Colorado Springs. The highways travel concurrently through Colorado Springs.
  in Colorado Springs. The highways travel concurrently to Castle Rock.
  in Denver
  in Denver
  in Denver. The highways travel concurrently through Denver.
  in Denver. The highways travel concurrently through Denver.
  in Denver
  in Denver
  southeast of Twin Lakes
  on the Twin Lakes–Sherrelwood–Welby line
  in Loveland
Wyoming
  south-southwest of Cheyenne
  southwest of Cheyenne
  in Cheyenne. The highways travel concurrently to Ranchettes.
  west-southwest of Dwyer Junction. The highways travel concurrently to the Casper–Hartrandt city line.
  in Orin. US 20/US 87 travels concurrently to the Casper–Hartrandt city line.
  in Casper. The highways travel concurrently to north-northeast of Buffalo.
  in Buffalo
  north-northeast of Buffalo. I-90/US 87 travels concurrently to Lockwood.
  in Sheridan. The highways travel concurrently to northeast of Ranchester.
Montana
  in Crow Agency. The highways travel concurrently to Lockwood.
  in Lockwood
  north of Klein. The highways travel concurrently to Roundup.
  in Lewistown. The highways travel concurrently to west-northwest of Moore.
  south-southeast of Armington. The highways travel concurrently to Great Falls.
  northeast of Herron

See also

Related routes
 U.S. Highway 187 (decommissioned)
 U.S. Highway 287

Bannered and suffixed routes
U.S. Route 87 Business in Cheyenne, Wyoming
U.S. Route 87 Business in Wheatland, Wyoming
U.S. Route 87 Business in Casper, Wyoming
U.S. Route 87 Business in Buffalo, Wyoming
U.S. Route 87 Bypass in Great Falls, Montana

References

External links
 

Endpoints of U.S. Highway 87

 
87
87
87
087
087